The 2022 PDC Winmau World Youth Championship was the twelfth edition of the PDC World Youth Championship, a tournament organised by the Professional Darts Corporation for darts players aged between 16 and 25.

The group stage and knock-out phase from the last 32 to the semi-finals were played at the Robin Park Tennis Centre, Wigan, on 9 October 2022. The final took place on 27 November 2022 at Butlin's Minehead, immediately before the final of the 2022 Players Championship Finals.

Ted Evetts was the defending champion after defeating Nathan Rafferty 6–4 in the 2021 final, but he was unable to defend his title, as he is now above the maximum age limit.

Josh Rock won the title, defeating Nathan Girvan 6–1 in final.

Prize money
The prize fund returned to its 2020 levels, following the slight rejig at the 2021 tournament. As with recent years, the finalists qualify for the following year's Grand Slam of Darts, and the winner also wins a place at the 2023 PDC World Darts Championship.

Qualifiers
The field of 96 players is made of PDC Tour Card Holders, Development Tour players and International Qualifiers. 14 Tour Card Holders accepted invitations to play, and will be joined by 23 international qualifiers, plus the 59 highest ranked players on the Development Tour Order of Merit who have not already qualified.

At 8 October, Professional Darts Corporation informed, that the 96-player field includes all age-qualified PDC Tour Card Holders and 20 international representatives, with the remainder of the field filled from the final PDC Development Tour Order of Merit.

Seeded players

Further Qualifiers

Draw

Group stage

Group 1

Group 2

Group 3

Group 4

Group 5

Group 6

Group 7

Group 8

Group 9

Group 10

Group 11

Group 12

Group 13

Group 14

Group 15

Group 16

Group 17

Group 18

Group 19

Group 20

Group 21

Group 22

Group 23

Group 24

Group 25

Group 26

Group 27

Group 28

Group 29

Group 30

Group 31

Group 32

Knockout Phase

Representation
This table shows the number of players by country in the tournament. A total of 23 nationalities are represented.

References

World Youth Championship
PDC World Youth Championship
PDC World Youth Championship
2022
PDC World Youth Championship